Zhaoge was the last of a series of cities that served as capital of the Shang dynasty, and later capital of State of Wey. It is located in current Qi County, Hebi, Henan about 50 km south of Anyang.

See also
Yinxu, another capital of Shang

References

Ancient Chinese capitals
Shang dynasty